Jean de Dieu Ntiruhungwa is the former minister of the interior of Rwanda. He became minister of the interior in 2001. He has been replaced with Christophe Bazivamo in 2004. Ntiruhungwa had been minister before he received that office.

References

Year of birth missing (living people)
Living people
Interior ministers of Rwanda
Place of birth missing (living people)